The Transformers The Movie: Original Motion Picture Soundtrack is the 1986 soundtrack from the motion picture The Transformers: The Movie. It was released in the United States by Scotti Bros. Records on LP and cassette. It was released in Japan by Pony Canyon on CD in 1989. In 1992, Scotti Bros. released the album on CD in the US. By 1999, it was subsequently re-issued by eventual successor company Volcano Entertainment, and was re-released in 2007 with updated cover art and 4 bonus tracks.

Track listing 
 "The Touch" (Performed by Stan Bush) (Produced by Richie Wise)
 "Instruments of Destruction" (Performed by NRG) (Produced by Ernie Burns)
 "Death of Optimus Prime" (Performed by Vince DiCola) (Produced by Vince DiCola and Ed Fruge)
 "Dare" (Performed by Stan Bush) (Produced by Vince DiCola and Richie Wise)
 "Nothin’s Gonna Stand in Our Way" (Performed by Spectre General) (Produced by Randy Bishop with Spencer Proffer for Pasha)
 "The Transformers (Theme)" (Performed by Lion) (Produced by Richie Wise)
 "Escape" (Performed by Vince DiCola) (Produced by Vince DiCola and Ed Fruge)
 "Hunger" (Performed by Spectre General) (Produced by Spencer Proffer for Pasha)
 "Autobot/Decepticon Battle" (Performed by Vince DiCola) (Produced by Vince DiCola and Ed Fruge)
 "Dare to Be Stupid" (Performed by "Weird Al" Yankovic) (Produced by Rick Derringer)

2007 re-release 

On May 29, 2007, the soundtrack was given the 20th Anniversary Special Edition treatment as was the movie when it was released on DVD on November 7, 2006. This version includes all 10 tracks from the original soundtrack, plus brand-new bonus material provided by Vince DiCola, the composer and producer of the film's score. The bonus material includes three additional score cues and an alternate version of the Transformers Theme performed by Stan Bush.

Track listing 
 "The Touch"
 "Instruments of Destruction"
 "Death of Optimus Prime"
 "Dare"
 "Nothin’s Gonna Stand in Our Way"
 "The Transformers (Theme)"
 "Escape"
 "Hunger"
 "Autobot/Decepticon Battle"
 "Dare to Be Stupid"
 "Unicron Medley"
 "Moon Base 2 - Shuttle Launch"
 "Megatron Must Be Stopped - Parts 1 and 2"
 "The Transformers (Theme) (Alternate Version)"

Legacy 

 Power-metal band N.R.G. has since been reborn as Damn Cheetah, with a first album release titled Primal.
 The Lion cover version of the main Transformers theme was itself covered on the NES by chiptune artist Inverse Phase and renamed to "NESformers".
 "Subsong 2" from the Commodore 64 game Turrican is actually the song "Escape" from The Transformers: The Movie soundtrack.

In popular culture 
 The song "The Touch" is performed by Mark Wahlberg's character Dirk Diggler in the 1997 film Boogie Nights. His performance appears as a hidden track on the soundtrack album to the film.
 Stan Bush's original version of "The Touch" was used in the 2008 Chuck episode "Chuck Versus Tom Sawyer". The song also appears in the games Shadow Warrior and Saints Row IV, along with an episode of American Dad! and The Goldbergs.
 The "Passiona High" sketch from cult Australian radio show Get This was based around several songs from the Transformers soundtrack, reworked into the storyline of an underdog nerd winning the eponymous school's annual synthesizer solo contest. The album tracks featured are "The Touch", "Autobot/Decepticon Battle", "Escape" and "Dare".
 The "Get Psyched Mix" from Barney Stinson and the "Bro Code" in How I Met Your Mother point "The Transformers Theme" as a "Classic Get Psyched Song".
 The Cybertronic Spree covers much of the album at conventions.
 The song "Dare" was featured in The Goldbergs Season 4 episode "Fonzie Scheme" during the scene when Barry is attempting to jump a golf cart off of a mound of dirt.
 "Dare" is also featured in "Live Studio Audience," the seventh episode for the first season of the Netflix series GLOW, during a wrestling training montage between main characters Ruth and Debbie.

"Dare" was used during the fight training scene in "Goon : Last of the Enforcers"

References

See also 

Album infoboxes lacking a cover
Animated film soundtracks
Movie: Original Motion Picture Soundtrack
1986 soundtrack albums
Volcano Entertainment soundtracks
Vince DiCola soundtracks
Scotti Brothers Records soundtracks